George Wolf (August 12, 1777March 11, 1840) was the seventh governor of Pennsylvania from 1829 to 1835. On June 29, 1888, he was recognized as the "father of the public-school system" in Pennsylvania by the erection of a memorial gateway at Easton.

Biography

Early years
Wolf was born in Allen Township, Pennsylvania.  His parents, George and Mary Wolf, had immigrated from Alsace, then a province of the Holy Roman Empire, in 1751. George Wolf was educated at a classical school, taught for some time, and then studied law. He was admitted to the bar in 1799 and commenced practice in Easton, Pennsylvania. He became a member of the Democratic Republican Party at the start of Thomas Jefferson's administration, and was appointed postmaster of Easton, which office he filled in 1802 and 1803.  He was a clerk of the orphans' court of Northampton County, Pennsylvania, from 1803 to 1809.  He was a member of the Pennsylvania House of Representatives in 1814.

Wolf married Mary Erb (1781–1833) of Lancaster, Pennsylvania, on June 5, 1798. The couple had eight sons and one daughter.

U.S. House of Representatives
Wolf was elected without opposition to the United States House of Representatives in 1824 to the Eighteenth Congress to fill the vacancy caused by the resignation of Thomas J. Rogers.  He was reelected to the Nineteenth, Twentieth, and Twenty-first Congresses. He took the protectionist side in debates on the tariff.

Governor of Pennsylvania
As member of the Jacksonian Democratic Party, Wolf defeated Joseph Ritner in both 1829 and 1832 to become the Governor of Pennsylvania. A large crowd attended his inaugural ceremonies on December 15, 1829.

He lost the governor's seat to the Anti-Mason candidate Ritner in 1835, owing to the defection of a part of the Democrats, who voted for Henry A. Muhlenberg.

As governor, Wolf persuaded the legislature to construct canals and impose new taxes for the liquidation of debts that had already been incurred on account of internal improvements. Wolf advocated the establishment of a general system of common schools, and by strenuous efforts accomplished this reform where former governors had failed. In the wake of the hanging of Charles Getter in Easton, which was viewed by up to 20,000 people, Wolf signed a law on April 10, 1834, to ban public executions.

Later years
From 1827 to 1840, Wolf was a trustee of Lafayette College. In 1836 Andrew Jackson appointed him as First Comptroller of the Treasury. Two years later President Martin Van Buren appointed him as Collector of Customs for the District of Philadelphia in a job swap with James Nelson Barker.  He held this office until his death.

Legacy
Wolf Hall on the campus of Penn State University is named for George Wolf. Wolf Township in Lycoming County is also named for him, as is Wolf Street in Philadelphia. The Governor Wolf Building, built in 1893 as the first Easton High School in Easton, the George Wolf Elementary School in Bath, and the Governor Wolf Elementary School in Bethlehem  are also named for Governor Wolf. The Governor Wolf Historical Society in East Allen Township is named for George Wolf and is the historic site of Wolf Academy where young George received a classical education and went on to become a teacher there.

References

Sources

The Political Graveyard

External links

The George Wolf papers, containing much of Wolf's correspondence from his time in office, are available for research use at the Historical Society of Pennsylvania.

1777 births
1840 deaths
Burials at Harrisburg Cemetery
Democratic Party governors of Pennsylvania
Democratic Party members of the Pennsylvania House of Representatives
Pennsylvania lawyers
American people of German descent
Pennsylvania Dutch people
Comptrollers of the United States Treasury
Pennsylvania postmasters
Democratic-Republican Party members of the United States House of Representatives from Pennsylvania
Jacksonian members of the United States House of Representatives from Pennsylvania
19th-century American politicians
Democratic-Republican Party state governors of the United States
Lafayette College trustees